The 2017 Grand National (officially known as the 2017 Randox Health Grand National for sponsorship reasons) was the 170th official running of the Grand National horse race at Aintree Racecourse near Liverpool, England. The showpiece steeplechase over a distance of  took place on 8 April 2017, the final day of a three-day meeting. A maximum field of 40 runners competed for a share of a prize fund of £1 million.

Randox Health is the new sponsor of the main race and the festival itself for the next five years. It was broadcast live on television by ITV for the first time. There was live radio coverage by BBC Radio, which has held the radio rights since 1927, and by Talksport, which covered the main race live for the fourth time.

The race was won by One For Arthur, only the second horse trained in Scotland to win the Grand National (the other being Rubstic in 1979).

Race card

A total of 110 entries were received for consideration in the 2017 Grand National and were announced on 1 February 2017. Among the early favourites were Don Poli, who won three Grade 1 races in the 2015–16 season, and 2016 National runner-up The Last Samuri. The 2015 winner, Many Clouds, who was also among the ante-post favourites, died of a pulmonary haemorrhage shortly before the entries were announced.

The weights were announced on 14 February and headed by Lexus Chase winner Outlander, however, trainer Gordon Elliott indicated that he would not run. The top five weighted horses were all Irish-trained, including three by Elliott. One runner (Otago Trail) was scratched before the weights were assigned. Ninety-five entries remained after the first scratching deadline on 28 February. Elliott, who had earlier expressed his dissatisfaction with the weights assigned to his horses, withdrew several of his entries, including Outlander, Empire of Dirt and Don Poli, leaving Carlingford Lough as the new top weight. Vieux Lion Rouge, who won the Grand National Trial at Haydock, was now the favourite with the bookmakers, at 12/1. The field was reduced to 79 following the second scratching deadline on 21 March. The five-day confirmation process began on 3 April with 70 horses advancing, following the withdrawal of top-weight Carlingford Lough. The final field was announced on 6 April, including four reserves in case of any withdrawals before 1 pm on 7 April. One of the top 40 horses going into the confirmation stage (Pendra) withdrew. There were no further withdrawals before the deadline, leaving the following 40 starters:

 Great Britain unless stated.
 Amateur jockeys denoted by preceding title, e.g. Mr.
 Liam Treadwell was due to ride Tenor Nivernais but was replaced by Coleman after getting injured.

Race overview 

Two false starts occurred before the race could get underway, the first caused by several horses running off too keenly and the second by The Young Master and Raz de Maree jumping the gun from a standing start. When the race eventually began properly, the 50/1 outsider Roi Des Francs led the field on the first circuit with Rogue Angel and Highland Lodge also prominent. The 10/1 second-favourite  Red was pulled up at Valentine's, whilst Saphir Du Rheu fell at the 11th.

As the horses rounded the turn to begin the second circuit, Roi Des Francs was carried out by a loose horse and rejoined the field in mid-division, leaving Rogue Angel as the new leader. Saint Are, Blaklion and Vieux Lion Rouge remained close behind the leaders. With five fences remaining, the 8/1 favourite Blaklion moved up to challenge Rogue Angel for the lead, with Saint Are going third and Cause of Causes coming into contention. With two fences left to jump, Blaklion raced into a three-length lead over Rogue Angel, as Vieux Lion Rouge advanced into third and One For Arthur made significant progress through the field.

At the second-last, One For Arthur jumped into the back of the leader Blaklion, with Cause of Causes and Gas Line Boy moving up to contest first place. The four were all stride for stride as they took the last fence, but One For Arthur jumped into the lead and accelerated to go three lengths clear at the elbow, increasing that advantage in the final furlong as he crossed the finish line  lengths ahead of Cause of Causes in second, with  lengths back to Saint Are, who ran on well to clinch third by half a length from Blaklion.

There were no fatalities and all 40 runners returned safely to the stables.

Finishing order

The 19 horses to complete the course finished as follows:

 Distance measures from smallest to largest winning margin: nose, short head, head, short neck, neck, one length, a distance.

Non-finishers
The runners who failed to complete were as follows:

Broadcasting and media 

As the Grand National is accorded the status of an event of national interest in the United Kingdom and is listed on the Ofcom Code on Sports and Other Listed and Designated Events, it must be shown on free-to-air terrestrial television in the UK. The race was broadcast live on TV by ITV. This was the first year that ITV broadcast the race live, following the decision by Channel 4 to drop the event and horse racing in general in 2016.

The coverage was led by Ed Chamberlin. Retired champion jockey Sir Anthony McCoy and Mick Fitzgerald provided expert opinions throughout the coverage, with reports from Brough Scott, Luke Harvey, Oli Bell and Alice Plunkett and betting updates by Matt Chapman. The commentary team was Mark Johnson, Ian Bartlett and Richard Hoiles, who called the winner home for the first time in his terrestrial television commentary career.

See also
Horse racing in Great Britain
List of British National Hunt races

References

External links
Official site

2017
Grand National
Grand National
21st century in Merseyside
April 2017 sports events in the United Kingdom
Grand